Khajani is a constituency of the Uttar Pradesh Legislative Assembly covering the city of Khajani in Gorakhpur district, Uttar Pradesh, India.

Khajani is one of five assembly constituencies in the Sant Kabir Nagar Lok Sabha constituency. Since 2008, this assembly constituency is numbered 325 amongst 403 constituencies.

Election results

2022

2017
Bharatiya Janta Party candidate Sant Prasad won in last Assembly election of 2017 Uttar Pradesh Legislative Elections defeating Bahujan Samaj Party candidate Rajkumar by a margin of 20,079 votes.

Members of the Legislative Assembly

References

External links
 

Assembly constituencies of Uttar Pradesh
Politics of Gorakhpur district